Burrell Clark Burchfiel (born March 21, 1934) is an American structural geologist. Born in Stockton, California, he earned his Ph.D. in 1961 at Yale University. His first academic appointment was to the Geology department at Rice University. He is the Schlumberger Professor Emeritus of Geology at MIT. Research interests: Origin, development, and structural evolution of the continental crust. His current work involves study of the geological history and evolution of the Tibetan plateau.

Professor Burchfiel joined the MIT faculty in 1976. Over his career he has written close to 200 papers and mentored more than 50 graduate students.

Selected publications
B. C. Burchfiel, Structural geology of the Spector Range Quadrangle, Nevada, and its regional significance, GSA Bulletin; February 1965; v. 76; no. 2; p. 175-191

B. C. Burchfiel, R. J. Fleck, D. T. Secor, R. R. Vincelette, and G. A. Davis, Geology of the Spring Mountains, Nevada, GSA Bulletin; July 1974; v. 85; no. 7; p. 1013–1022

B. C. Burchfiel and G. A. Davis, Nature and controls of Cordilleran orogenesis, western United States: Extensions of an earlier synthesis, American Journal of Science; 1975,; v. 275; no. A; p. 363-396

Burchfiel, B.C., and Davis, G.A., 1981, Mojave Desert and environs, in Ernst, W.G., ed., The geotectonic development of California (Rubey volume 1): Englewood Cliffs, N.J., Prentice-Hall, p. 217-252.

B. Clark Burchfiel, Brian Wernicke, James H. Willemin, Garry J. Axen & C. Scott Cameron, A new type of decollement thrusting, Nature 300, 513 - 515 (9 December 1982) Abstract

Peter Molnar, B. Clark Burchfiel, Liang K'uangyi, and Zhao Ziyun, Geologic Evolution of Northern Tibet: Results of an Expedition to Ulugh Muztagh, 1987, Science Vol. 235. no. 4786, pp. 299 – 305.  Abstract

B. Clark Burchfiel, and L. H. Royden, Antler Orogeny; a mediterranean-type orogeny,  Geology; January 1991; v. 19; no. 1; p. 66-69

B. C. Burchfiel, D. S. Cowan, and G. A. Davis, 1992, Tectonic overview of the Cordilleran orogen in the western U. S., in Burchfiel, B. C., Lipman, P. W., and Zoback, M. L., eds., The Cordilleran Orogen: conterminous U. S.: The Geology of North America, Volume G-3, Decade of North American Geology, Geological Society of America, Boulder, p. 407-480.

Burchfiel, B. C. and Nakov, R. (2015), The multiply deformed foreland fold-thrust belt of the Balkan orogen, northern Bulgaria.  Geosphere, vol. 11, no. 2, pp. 463–490, doi: 10.1130/ges01020.1

Awards and positions held
1985, elected to National Academy of Sciences
1995, Career Achievement Award from the Geological Society of America
1998, elected to the Chinese Academy of Sciences
2003, elected President of the Geological Society of America
2009, Awarded the Penrose Medal; see List of Penrose Medal winners
2013, Awarded the Distinguished Service Award, International Division of the Geological Society of America

References

External links
 Use of GPS in field work in Tibet; structural geology of the eastern Tibetan plateau 2003 GSA Presidential address, by B.C. Burchfiel

Living people
Members of the United States National Academy of Sciences
Foreign members of the Chinese Academy of Sciences
American geologists
Structural geologists
Yale University alumni
Rice University faculty
Massachusetts Institute of Technology School of Science faculty
1934 births
Penrose Medal winners
Presidents of the Geological Society of America